is a name used for multiple mountains in Japan. It can refer to:
Mount Izumi Katsuragi, on the border of Osaka and Wakayama Prefectures
Mount Minami Katsuragi, east of Mt. Izumi Katsuragi, south of Mount Iwawaki
Mount Naka Katsuragi, south of Mt. Kongō
Mount Yamato Katsuragi, straddling the prefectural line between Nara and Osaka Prefectures
Mount Katsuragi (Izunokuni) on the Izu Peninsula, Shizuoka

When read "Katsuragi-yama," it collectively refers to Mount Kongō and Mount Yamato Katsuragi

See also
Kongō Range, a mountain range which was formerly called the Katsuragi Range